Mano Negra Illegal is a tribute album to the French world/punk band Mano Negra, released in 2001 on the Big Mama label (see 2001 in music).

Track listing
Ska-P - "Señor Matanza" (Manu Chao, Mano Negra) – 3:35
Flor Del Fango + Arnaud Samuel (Louise Attaque) - "Sidi H' Bibi" (Traditional, arrangement by Mano Negra) – 3:25
Yuri Buenaventura - "Mala Vida" (Chao) – 4:29
Les Caméléons - "Soledad" (Chao) – 2:35
Les Ogres de Barback - "La Ventura" (Chao) – 3:34
Freedom For King Kong - "King Kong Five" (Chao, Mano Negra) – 3:46
Big Mama - "Bala Perdida" (Mano Negra, Fidel Nadal]) – 4:34
Skunk - "Indios De Barcelona" (Chao) – 2:34
M'Panada - "Salga La Luna/El Jako" (Chao, Mano Negra) – 4:12
GrimSkunk - "Machine Gun" (Chao, Mano Negra) – 3:17
Le Maximum Kouette - "Out of Time Man" (Chao, Mano Negra) – 4:03
Marcel & Son Orchestre - "Noche de Acción" (Chao) – 2:56
Rude Boy System - "It's My Heart" (Mano Negra) – 4:08
Les Fils De Teuhpu - "Patchuko Hop" (Joe "King" Carrasco) – 3:54
Fermin Muguruza - "Guayaquil City" (Mano Negra, T. Darnal) – 4:04
Kanjar'Oc - "Bring The Fire" (Chao, Mano Negra) – 4:20
Grave De Grave - "Madame Oscar" (Chao, Mano Negra) – 4:19
Percubaba - "Junky Beat" (Chao) – 2:55
Les Hurlements D'Léo - "Love and Hate" (Chao, Mano Negra) – 2:30
La Ruda Salska - "Ronde de Nuit" (Chao) – 3:17

Tribute albums
Mano Negra (band) albums
2001 compilation albums